Frederick Romaine Applegate (May 9, 1879 – April 21, 1968) was a Major League Baseball pitcher in 1904 for the Philadelphia Athletics. Between September 30 and October 10, he started and completed three games, winning 1 and losing 2 with an ERA of 6.43.  His lone major league win came against the Washington Senators in his third and final start.  The score was 7–6.

A good hitter and fielder during his brief time in the big leagues, he batted .286 (2-for-7) and handled eight chances without making an error.

A native of Williamsport, Pennsylvania, he died in his hometown at the age of 88.

External links

Retrosheet

Major League Baseball pitchers
Baseball players from Pennsylvania
Philadelphia Athletics players
1879 births
1968 deaths
Minor league baseball managers
Williamsport Demorest Bicycle Boys players
Newark Sailors players
Montreal Royals players
Worcester Riddlers players
Montgomery Black Sox players
New Orleans Pelicans (baseball) players
Toronto Maple Leafs (International League) players
Johnstown Johnnies players
Williamsport Millionaires players
Wilkes-Barre Barons (baseball) players
Lincoln Railsplitters players
Paris Bourbonites players